is a Japanese psychological horror manga written and illustrated by Kyoko Okazaki. It was serialized in Feel Young magazine from 1995 to 1996 and collected into a single tankōbon volume by Shodensha on April 8, 2003. The story was adapted into a 2012 live-action film directed by Mika Ninagawa and starring Erika Sawajiri. The manga was released in English by Vertical in 2013.

Plot
Supermodel  has undergone full body plastic surgery to attain the perfect body and face in order to stay on top of the modeling world. However, her body begins to break down as an effect of the treatments and she grows desperate and unhinged, lashing out at first to her manager, Hiroko Tada (alias Mom) and agency and later to the public as she realizes that her current lifestyle cannot last long. The matter is made worse when Tada introduces Liliko to Kozue Yoshikawa whose natural beauty and friendly demeanor makes her a popular fashion icon to women all around. The process of her popularity makes Liliko more unhinged and fearful that she will fade to obscurity. In an attempt to stay ahead, Liliko forces her overly stressed out assistant, Michiko Hada, and her boyfriend to sabotage Kozue.

Meanwhile, an inspector investigating a series of mysterious suicides and organ theft believes that Liliko and her unnatural beauty may be the key to unearthing an underground industry of unsafe medical practice and save lives. Spending time with her less attractive younger sister, Chiharu, the inspector is given a photo of what she used to look like. He is able to meet with Liliko with a warning that she may not be able to keep hiding behind her unnatural beauty forever. Eventually Liliko meets with Chiharu discussing her problems at school. Liliko selfishly suggests that her sister lose weight by getting a full body makeover with plastic surgery done to her. This makes Chiharu uncomfortable about it and makes her realize that the Liliko she once remembered is gone. She meets with the inspector again who sympathetically suggests she goes for a more natural approach by exercising and eating healthier.

Tada talks to Kozue about what she wants to do in five years and if she plans to keep modeling. To her surprise, Kozue admits that she actually looks forward to having a normal, obscure life and doesn't really care if anyone remembers her or not. Later on, Tada has a talk with the makeup artist who had long worked for her agency and Kozue learns Liliko's dark secret in having plastic surgery. Although she doesn't say anything about it, trouble is on the horizon.

After losing her job and her boyfriend ending their relationship, Hada had enough of Liliko's manipulation and cruelty towards her. Out of spite and revenge, she sends every information of Liliko's dirty secrets to tabloid magazines everywhere. Hada's exposure brings trouble to Liliko, Tada's modeling agency, and the hospital. Soon everyone starts spurning Liliko by deriding her as a fake for her actions against her assistant, sabotage against Kozue and hiding what she used to look like underneath her fake body. Despite Tada's best efforts, upon realizing how much no one loves her, Liliko decides to destroy herself during a press conference. She seemingly disappears from the spotlight after that.

Five years later, Kozue is now the top supermodel and the hospital has been further investigated. Tada's agency has shut down as the result of losing her models to the controversy surrounding her involvement with the hospital. The investigator has been transferred to another department where he encounters Chiharu who is more attractive as the result of both losing weight and corrective surgery. While partying with her makeup artist and friends after a photo shoot in Mexico, Kozue spies Tada for a moment before disappearing. Later, she celebrates the end of the shoot by going to a club notable for its "strange shows" and sees Liliko about to perform, wearing an eyepatch over her left eye.

Film cast
 Erika Sawajiri as Liliko Hirukoma
 Nao Ōmori as Makoto Asada
 Shinobu Terajima as Michiko Hada
 Gō Ayano as Shinichi Okumura
 Kiko Mizuhara as Kozue Yoshikawa
 Hirofumi Arai as Kinji Sawanabe 
 Anne Suzuki as Kumi Hosuda
 Susumu Terajima as Keita Tsukahara 
 Kaori Momoi as Hiroko Tada
 Show Aikawa as Mikio Hamaguchi
 Mieko Harada as Hisako Wachi
 Yōsuke Kubozuka as Takao Nanbu

Reception
Helter Skelter won an award of excellence at the Japan Media Arts Festival sponsored by the Japanese government in 2004. The manga also won the Grand Prize at the 2004 Tezuka Osamu Cultural Prize. In 2008, it was nominated as an Official Selection at the Angoulême International Comics Festival in France.

Reviewing Helter Skelter, Rebecca Silverman of Anime News Network gave the manga an overall A− grade. She believes Okazaki implies that the readers are "implicit in the creation of Lilikos with our craving for unattainable beauty in the media." She noted that some people will find the story difficult to stomach and the artwork "harsh," although the latter helps the story.

As of August 19, 2012, the film had grossed US$24,231,554 at the Japanese box office.

References

External links
 Official film website 
 
 
 

1995 manga
2010s psychological horror films
2012 horror films
Body image in popular culture
Films about modeling
Films directed by Mika Ninagawa
Films set in Tokyo
Films shot in Tokyo
Josei manga
Manga adapted into films
Psychological horror anime and manga
Shodensha manga
Vertical (publisher) titles
Winner of Tezuka Osamu Cultural Prize (Grand Prize)
Works about plastic surgery
Japanese psychological horror films